Peter Ellis may refer to:
Peter Ellis (architect) (1805–1884), architect who designed the Oriel Chambers in Liverpool
Peter Ellis (actor) (born 1936), actor in The Bill
Peter Ellis (director) (1948–2006), British television director
Peter Ellis (duathlete) (born 1983), British Elite duathlete
Peter Ellis (footballer) (1947–2013), Australian rules footballer
Peter Ellis (rugby league) (born 1976), former professional rugby league footballer
Peter Berresford Ellis (born 1943), historian; expert on Celtic history
Peter Ellis (childcare worker) (1958–2019), New Zealander wrongfully convicted of child molestation in 1993
Peter Ellis (cricketer) (born 1932), English cricketer
Peter J. Ellis, candidate of the Christian Heritage Party
Peter Ellis, candidate of the Green Party of Canada

See also
Earl Hancock Ellis or Pete Ellis (1880–1923), U.S. marine
Ellis Peters, pseudonym used by Edith Pargeter, British author